"The Lords of Salem" is the eleventh and final track on Rob Zombie's 2006 album, Educated Horses. It can also be found on Zombie's greatest hits album The Best of Rob Zombie, Zombie's live album Zombie Live, and the soundtrack for The Covenant.

The song is based on the Salem witchcraft trials of the 17th century. An animated music video, much similar to that of "American Witch", was made in 2006.

Reception
Although no single was released and it did not chart, the song was nominated for a Grammy award for Best Hard Rock Performance for the 2009 Grammy awards. The live version heard on Zombie Live was the nominated track. Zombie later directed a film titled The Lords of Salem which is unrelated to the song.

Personnel
 Tom Baker - mastering
 Chris Baseford - engineer
 Blasko - bass, background vocals
 Tommy Clufetos - drums, background vocals
 Scott Humphrey - production
 John 5 - guitar, background vocals
 Will Thompson - assistant engineer
 Rob Zombie - vocals, lyrics, production

References

External links
Official Rob Zombie website

Rob Zombie songs
Songs based on American history
Animated music videos
2006 songs
Songs written by Rob Zombie
Songs written by John 5
Songs written by Scott Humphrey